Defending champion Novak Djokovic defeated Milos Raonic in the final, 6–2, 6–3 to win the singles tennis title at the 2014 Paris Masters. He became the first man to defend the title at the Paris Masters, and it was his record-equaling third title at the event (tying Boris Becker and Marat Safin). He did not lose a single set in the entire tournament.

Seeds
All seeds receive a bye into the second round. 

 Novak Djokovic (champion)
 Roger Federer (quarterfinals)
 Stan Wawrinka (third round)
 David Ferrer (quarterfinals)
 Tomáš Berdych (semifinals)
 Kei Nishikori (semifinals)
 Milos Raonic (final)
 Andy Murray (quarterfinals)
 Grigor Dimitrov (third round)
 Jo-Wilfried Tsonga (third round)
 Roberto Bautista Agut (third round)
 Feliciano López (third round)
 John Isner (second round)
 Kevin Anderson (quarterfinals)
 Gilles Simon (second round)
 Fabio Fognini (second round)

Draw

Finals

Top half

Section 1

Section 2

Bottom half

Section 3

Section 4

Qualifying

Seeds

 Sam Querrey (qualified)
 Steve Johnson (first round)
 Jack Sock (qualified)
 Jan-Lennard Struff (first round)
 Gilles Müller (qualifying competition)
 Andreas Seppi (first round)
 Denis Istomin (qualified)
 Bernard Tomic (qualifying competition)
 Jarkko Nieminen (qualifying competition)
 Sergiy Stakhovsky (qualifying competition)
 Federico Delbonis (qualifying competition)
 Teymuraz Gabashvili (first round)

Qualifiers

Qualifying draw

First qualifier

Second qualifier

Third qualifier

Fourth qualifier

Fifth qualifier

Sixth qualifier

References
General
 Main Draw
 Qualifying Draw
Specific

BNP Paribas Masters - Singles
2014 Singles